Herbert Sparling (1864–1944) was a British comedy and musical theatre actor and director.

In 1889 Sparling was sued for breach of contract at Brompton County Court by the "dramatic author" Henry Plunkett Gratton (1808–1889), who alleged that in 1887 he and Sparling had made an agreement that Gratton would rewrite a drama for Sparling in return for which he would receive periodic payments from Sparling. When asked for the second payment Sparling made various excuses and quit his lodgings on The Strand. The outcome was that Gratton was awarded £10 for the work he had already done.

Sparling appeared as Dudley Harcourt in My Sweetheart (1891) at the Vaudeville Theatre; Luigi Di Volpa in F. C. Burnand's Private Enquiry (1891) at the Strand Theatre; Lyngstrand in Ibsen's The Lady from the Sea (1891) at Terry's Theatre; Josiah Higgins in Morocco Bound (1893); Sir Wormwood Scrubs in Howard Talbot's comic opera Wapping Old Stairs (1894); as Lord Lavender in The Lady Slavey (1894); Detective in A Melodrama at the Trafalgar Theatre (1894); in an American tour of A Little Ray of Sunshine (1899) which played at Chickering Hall in Boston and Wallack's Theatre in New York among other venues; William Piddock in 22A, Curzon Street at the Garrick Theatre (1898): Pomponius in A Greek Slave at the Herald Square Theatre in New York (1899); in Little Nell and the Marchioness at the Herald Square Theatre (1900); Lord Framlingham in Lady Madcap at the Prince of Wales Theatre (1904); Mr Tobin in Noah's Ark at the Waldorf Theatre (1906); and the Duke of Tysmoke in Nelly Neil at the Aldwych Theatre (1907).

In July 1911 Sparling accompanied Marie George in a performance at Brighton Palace Pier, where:
Marie George gives the audience twenty minutes of sparkling fun, and makes them regret very much the powers that be which prevent her continuing her part for double that period. She is delightful in her songs, "That’s a Cinch", and "Over again". She is most ably assisted by Mr. Herbert Sparling, whose make-up as a pianoforte turner and acting throughout is wonderfully clever.

He was Marquis de Bouillaibaise in Baron Trenck at the Strand Theatre (1911); Percy Fitzwinney on tour in the musical comedy The Boy Scout (1912) with Marie George and C. Hayden Coffin, which he also directed; Dickie Bramsgrove in the musical The Officers' Mess at St Martin's Theatre (1918) and after at the Prince's Theatre (1919). and Harkins in The Half Moon (1920) at the Liberty Theatre in New York.

In his later years he lived at 25 Portland Place in Brighton, Sussex, where he died in 1944 aged 80.

References

1864 births
1944 deaths
English male musical theatre actors
19th-century English male actors
English male stage actors
20th-century English male actors